Jim Moodie (1 December 1905 – 6 March 1980) was a former Australian rules footballer who played with Melbourne in the Victorian Football League (VFL).

Notes

External links 

1905 births
Australian rules footballers from Victoria (Australia)
Melbourne Football Club players
1980 deaths